Men With Wings is a 1938 American Technicolor war film, directed by  William A. Wellman and starring Fred MacMurray, Ray Milland, and Louise Campbell. Donald O'Connor also has a small part as the younger version of MacMurray's character. The two would soon star in the film Sing You Sinners together along with Bing Crosby.

Plot
In 1903, the Wright brothers set the scene for aviation's advances and influence barnstormer, Pat Falconer and his friend, engineer Scott Barnes. Falconer marries childhood sweetheart Peggy Ransom although Barnes also loves her, but is unwilling to jeopardize his relationship with his friend.

During World War I, Falconer becomes a fighter pilot and after the war continues to fly by "the seat-of-his-pants" rather than do the methodical work of flight research like Barnes. As the 1930s come to a close, restless Falconer leaves his family and friend behind, taking off for China to fight Japanese invaders.

Cast

Production
For  Men with Wings, Wellman was able to utilize a vast amount of talent and resources to stage the epic. Besides the impressive array of movie talent, the film was one of the first Hollywood productions to utilize the Technicolor three-strip camera process pioneered by the Technicolor Motion Picture Corporation. 

Wellman had a special affinity to both the story and aviation in general. In World War I, earning himself the nickname "Wild Bill", Wellman was first an ambulance driver in the Norton-Harjes Ambulance Corps, then joined the French Foreign Legion. On December 3, 1917, assigned as the first American fighter pilot to join N.87 escadrille in the Lafayette Flying Corps, Wellman went on to score three recorded "kills", along with five probables and to receive the Croix de Guerre with two palms.

The use of mocked-up Nieuport 28 and Thomas-Morse Scout fighters along with other period aircraft such as one real Fokker D.VII and the ubiquitous Travelair "Wichita Fokkers" were featured in the aerial sequences.  Principal photography took place primarily at California airport locales. Hollywood stunt pilot Paul Mantz was involved in both flying and directing the aerial filming.

Aircraft used in the film
Men with Wings chronicles the "Golden Era" of aviation (1903–1938), featuring a number of significant aircraft in the production, including:
 Airco DH.4
 Boeing 247
 Boeing P-12E
 Buhl LA-1 Pup
 Fokker D.VII
 Lockheed Vega
 Garland-Lincoln: LF-1
 Pfalz D.XII
 Royal Aircraft Factory S.E.5
 SPAD S.VII
 Thomas-Morse Scout
 Travel Air Model B "Wichita Fokker"

Reception
Men with Wings received good reviews from critics and audience alike. Variety noted the film  "is a giant bomber from the Paramount hangar, designed on a lavish scale by the skilled air picture mechanic, William A. Wellman, and polished off beautifully in Technicolor. The action scenes, including a dog fight in the air, are exceptionally impressive. Men with Wings was considered an aviation classic, "one of the best pre-war flight films, true to life, and done without replicas ... A buff's dream." The juxtaposing of a love interest, however, was jarring, with critics commenting on that plotline being forced.

Notes

Citations

References

 Hardwick, Jack and Ed Schnepf. "A Viewer's Guide to Aviation Movies". The Making of the Great Aviation Films, General Aviation Series, Volume 2, 1989.
 Parish, James Robert. The Great Combat Pictures: Twentieth-Century Warfare on the Screen. Metuchen, New Jersey: The Scarecrow Press, 1990. .
 Silke, James R. "Fists, Dames & Wings." Air Progress Aviation Review, Volume 4, No. 4, October 1980.
 Thompson, Frank T. William A. Wellman (Filmmakers Series). Metuchen, New Jersey: Scarecrow Press, 1983. .
 Wellman, William A. Go, Get 'em! The True Adventures of an American Aviator of the Lafayette Flying Corps. Boston: The Page Company, 1918.
 Wellman, William A. A Short Time for Insanity: An Autobiography. New York: Hawthorn Books, 1974. .
 Wellman, William Jr. The Man And His Wings: William A. Wellman and the Making of the First Best Picture. New York: Praeger Publishers, 2006. .

External links

"Men with Wings" signed script at L. Tom Perry Special Collections, Harold B. Lee Library, Brigham Young University

1938 films
American aviation films
Films directed by William A. Wellman
Paramount Pictures films
American war films
1938 war films
1930s English-language films
1930s American films